Gubal may refer to:
 an island in the Strait of Gubal in the Gulf of Suez
 a Bronze Age name of the Canaanite city Byblos
 a musical instrument developed by PANArt Hang Manufacturing Ltd.: Gubal (instrument)